Šegotići is a settlement in the Republic of Croatia, part of the Municipality of Marčana, Istria County.

History 
In April 1921 during Proština rebellion, village was burned to the ground by the fascist squadrons.

Demography 
According to the 2001 census, the settlement had 94 inhabitants and 32 households.

See also 

 Marčana
 Krnica
 Proština rebellion

References 

Populated places in Istria County